Bjørn Erik Simensen (born 28 June 1947) is a Norwegian culture administrator and former journalist. He is known as director of the Norwegian National Opera from 1984 to 1990 and 1997 to 2009.

He was born in Lillehammer. Starting his career as a journalist, he worked in Fredriksstad Blad and then in Sunnmørsposten from 1966 to 1972.

He then worked as a culture administrator. First, 1973 to 1980, he worked in Sandefjord municipality. He then became director of Gothenburg Concert Hall from 1980 to 1984, then of the Gothenburg Symphony before his first period as director of the Norwegian National Opera, from 1984 to 1990.

He was editor-in-chief for the national newspaper Dagbladet from 1990 to 1995 before returning to the National Opera. He oversaw the construction of the Oslo Opera House, which was opened in 2008. He stepped down in 2009.

On 3 December 2007, Simensen was appointed Commander of the Royal Norwegian Order of St. Olav.

References

1947 births
Living people
Norwegian theatre directors
Norwegian newspaper editors
Dagbladet people
People from Lillehammer